Raj Kumar (born 15 December 1959) is a professor of neurosurgery. He was a founding director of All India Institute of Medical Sciences, Rishikesh and former vice-chancellor of Uttar Pradesh University of Medical Sciences.

Education and career

Education
He did his B.Sc. from Kanpur University in 1980. After that he joined Ganesh Shankar Vidyarthi Memorial Medical College, Kanpur and completed his M.B.B.S. and M.S. (Master of Surgery) in 1985 and 1990 respectively. He attended All India Institute of Medical Sciences, Delhi and completed his M.Ch. in 1993. Later he did his Ph.D. in Neuro Ayurveda from University of Lucknow in 2013 and was awarded D.Sc. (Honorary) from Uttar Pradesh University of Medical Sciences in 2018. He became a fellow and member of Royal College of Surgeons USA in 2008, fellow of Academy of Sci. Engine. & Techno. in 2010, fellow of National Academy of Medical Sciences in 2013 and fellow of Neurological Society of India in 2015.

Career
After completing his education he joined Sanjay Gandhi Postgraduate Institute of Medical Sciences of Lucknow as a faculty and later became Professor and Head,  Department of Neurosurgery, Sanjay Gandhi Postgraduate Institute of Medical Sciences. In 2012, he joined All India Institute of Medical Sciences, Rishikesh as founding director. In 2015 he left All India Institute of Medical Sciences, Rishikesh and again joined Sanjay Gandhi Postgraduate Institute of Medical Sciences. He also served as Chief of Trauma Centre at Sanjay Gandhi Postgraduate Institute of Medical Sciences. In June 2018, he joined Uttar Pradesh University of Medical Sciences of Saifai as vice-chancellor. He was removed from his vice-chancellor post in May 2021, because of his failure in covid 19 management.

Books authored
Raj has authored many books widely used as textbooks in many colleges across India.

 Text book of Neurosurgery by B Ramamurthy & PN Tandon (5 chapters)
 A Text Book of Traumatic Brain Injury by AK Mahapatra, Raj Kumar and R Kamal (co-author)

References

External links 
Official website

Living people
Heads of universities and colleges in India
20th-century Indian medical doctors
Medical doctors from Uttar Pradesh
Chhatrapati Shahu Ji Maharaj University alumni
All India Institute of Medical Sciences, New Delhi alumni
University of Lucknow alumni
Academic staff of Uttar Pradesh University of Medical Sciences
Indian medical administrators
1959 births